The following elections occurred in 1963.

 1963 Cardinal electors in Papal conclave
 1963 Papal conclave

Africa
 1963 Chadian parliamentary election
 1963 Moroccan parliamentary election
 1963 Republic of the Congo parliamentary election
 1963 Senegalese general election
 1963 Togolese general election
 1963 Kenyan legislative election
 1963 Liberian general election
 1963 Mauritian general election
 1963 Zanzibari general election

Asia
 1963 Israeli presidential election
 1963 Kuwaiti general election
 1963 Philippine Senate election
 1963 Singaporean general election

Iran
 1963 Iranian constitutional referendum
 1963 Iranian legislative election

Europe
 1963 Dutch general election
 1963 Greek legislative election
 1963 Icelandic parliamentary election
 1963 Italian general election
 1963 Norwegian local elections

Germany
 1963 Rhineland-Palatinate state election

United Kingdom
 1963 Belfast South by-election
 1963 Bristol South East by-election
 1963 Kinross and Western Perthshire by-election
 1963 Labour Party leadership election (UK)
 1963 Stratford by-election
 1963 Swansea East by-election
 1963 West Bromwich by-election

North America

Canada
 1963 Alberta general election
 1963 British Columbia general election
 1963 Canadian federal election
 1963 Edmonton municipal election
 1963 New Brunswick general election
 1963 Nova Scotia general election
 1963 Ontario general election

United States
 1963–64 Louisiana gubernatorial election
 1963 Philadelphia municipal election

Oceania
 1963 Fijian general election
 1963 New Zealand general election

Australia
 1963 Australian federal election
 1963 Queensland state election

South America
 1963 Argentine general election
 1963 Brazilian constitutional referendum
 1963 Venezuelan presidential election
 1963 Peruvian general election
 1963 Honduran general election
 1963 Nicaraguan general election

See also

 
1963
Elections